Fast Man Raider Man is the eleventh studio album and a double-album by Frank Black released in 2006.

Track listing
All tracks are written by Frank Black, except where noted.

Disc one

Disc two

Personnel
Credits adapted from the album's liner notes.
Musicians

Frank Black – lead vocals, guitar, ukulele
Bob Babbitt – bass guitar, backing vocals
Bobby Bare Jr. – backing vocals
Billy Block – drums, backing vocals
Marty Brown – bass guitar, backing vocals, duet vocal on Dirty Old Town
Violet Clark-Thompson – backing vocals
Jack Clement – dobro, backing vocals
Steve Cropper – guitar
Rick Duvall – backing vocals
Steve Ferrone – drums
Rich Gilbert – pedal steel guitar
James Griffin – backing vocals
Levon Helm – drums, percussion
David Hood – bass guitar
Ellis Hooks – backing vocals
Wayne Jackson – trumpet, trombone, fluegelhorn
Duane Jarvis – guitar
Mark Jordan – keyboards
Carol Kaye – guitar, bass guitar
Jim Keltner – drums, percussion
Simon Kirke – drums, percussion
Jack Kidney – harmonica, tenor saxophone
Al Kooper – organ
Ian McLagan – keyboards
Buddy Miller – guitar, mando guitar, backing vocals
Spooner Oldham – keyboards, backing vocals
Tom Petersson – bass guitar
Dave Phillips – pedal steel guitar
P.F. Sloan – piano, backing vocals
Billy Swan – backing vocals
Planet Swan – backing vocals
Sierra Swan – backing vocals
Akil Thompson – drums
Chester Thompson – drums
Jon Tiven – alto saxophone, guitar, percussion, piano, backing vocals
Brooks Watson – backing vocals
Lyle Workman – guitar, arrangements (disc 1: tracks 1, 3, 6-13; disc 2: 2, 11) 
Reggie Young – guitar

Technical

Brian Borelli – assistant engineer
Jake Burns – engineer, mixing
Scott Carter – assistant engineer
Marc Chevalier – engineer
Adam Deane – assistant engineer
Jim DeMain – mastering
Earl Drake – additional mixing
Jonathan Eubanks – assistant engineer
Michael Halsband – photography
Brent Hardy-Smith – illustrations
Alex McCollough – assistant engineer  
Einar Pedersen – assistant engineer  
Dan Penn – engineer
Adam Przybyla – assistant engineer 
Kevin Rains – assistant engineer
Dan Steinman – assistant engineer
Andrew Swainson – cover design, illustrations
Jon Tiven – producer, engineer
Brooks Watson – assistant engineer 
Miles Wilson – engineer
David Z – mixing

References

2006 albums
Black Francis albums
Cooking Vinyl albums